Earl of Strathmore and Kinghorne is a title in the Peerage of Scotland and the Peerage of the United Kingdom. It was first created as Earl of Kinghorne in the Peerage of Scotland in 1606 for Patrick Lyon. In 1677, the designation of the earldom changed to "Strathmore and Kinghorne". A second earldom was bestowed on the 14th Earl in the Peerage of the United Kingdom in 1937, leading to him being titled as the  14th and 1st Earl of Strathmore and Kinghorne.

Aside from the earldoms, the Earl holds the subsidiary titles: Viscount Lyon (created 1677), Lord Glamis, Tannadyce, Sidlaw and Strathdichtie (1677), Lord Lyon and Glamis (1606), Lord Glamis (1445) and Baron Bowes (1887) of Streatlam Castle, in the County of Durham, and of Lunedale, in the County of York. An earlier creation of Baron Bowes (1815), in favour of the 10th Earl became extinct on his death in 1821. The first three are in the Peerage of Scotland; the last two in the Peerage of the United Kingdom. The eldest son of the earl uses Lord Glamis as a courtesy title. Normally, the highest subsidiary title (in this case Viscount Lyon) would be used, but Lord Glamis is used instead to prevent confusion with the officer of arms, Lord Lyon King of Arms. The earl is also Chief of Clan Lyon.

Queen Elizabeth The Queen Mother (1900–2002) was the daughter of the 14th Earl of Strathmore and Kinghorne, and the sister of the 15th Earl.

The family seat is Glamis Castle, in Angus, Scotland. Other family seats were Gibside, near Burnopfield, County Durham and Streatlam Castle, near Barnard Castle in County Durham. The traditional burial place of the Earls of Strathmore and Kinghorne is in an aisle of Glamis parish church.

History
The established history of Clan Lyon states that the family is of French origin, with the original name de Leonne, but James Balfour Paul, in his Scots Peerage, states that the family is likely of Celtic origin. The family's earliest recorded possessions, the thanages of Glamis, Glamis, Tannadyce and Belhelvies, were in a Celtic stronghold, while government positions held by family chiefs would have required fluency in Gaelic.

The first recorded family member, John Lyon, Lord of Glamis, was a courtier and diplomat, who was appointed Keeper of the Privy Seal in 1371 on the accession of Robert II. He acquired significant lands, and on 18 March 1372, Robert II granted him "the free barony of Glamuyss in the sheriffdom of Forfar." Glamis has remained the seat of the family ever since.

Thanes of Glamis (1372)
John Lyon, 1st Thane of Glamis (died 1382)

Masters of Glamis
John Lyon, 1st Master of Glamis (died 1435)

Lord Glamis (1445)
Patrick Lyon, 1st Lord Glamis (died 1459)
Alexander Lyon, 2nd Lord Glamis (died 1486)
John Lyon, 3rd Lord Glamis (died 1497)
John Lyon, 4th Lord Glamis (died 1500)
George Lyon, 5th Lord Glamis (died 1505)
John Lyon, 6th Lord Glamis (–1528)
John Lyon, 7th Lord Glamis (–1558) (forfeit in 1537 but restored in 1543)
John Lyon, 8th Lord Glamis (–1578): see also Thomas Lyon (of Auldbar), Master of Glamis.
Patrick Lyon, 9th Lord Glamis (c. 1575–1615) (created Earl of Kinghorne in 1606)

Earls of Kinghorne (1606)
Patrick Lyon, 1st Earl of Kinghorne (c. 1575–1615)
John Lyon, 2nd Earl of Kinghorne (1596–1646)
Patrick Lyon, 3rd Earl of Kinghorne (1643–1695) (designation of the earldom changed to "Strathmore and Kinghorne")

Earls of Strathmore and Kinghorne (1677)
Patrick Lyon, 3rd Earl of Strathmore and Kinghorne (1643–1695)
John Lyon, 4th Earl of Strathmore and Kinghorne (1663–1712)
Patrick Lyon, Lord Glamis (1692–1709)
Philip Lyon, Lord Glamis (1693–1712)
John Lyon, 5th Earl of Strathmore and Kinghorne (1696–1715)
Charles Lyon, 6th Earl of Strathmore and Kinghorne (c. 1699–1728) – brother of the 5th Earl
James Lyon, 7th Earl of Strathmore and Kinghorne (c. 1702–1735) – brother of the 5th and 6th Earls
Thomas Lyon, 8th Earl of Strathmore and Kinghorne (1704–1753) – brother of the 5th, 6th and 7th Earls
John Bowes, 9th Earl of Strathmore and Kinghorne (1737–1776)
John Bowes, 10th Earl of Strathmore and Kinghorne (1769–1820)
Thomas Lyon-Bowes, 11th Earl of Strathmore and Kinghorne (1773–1846) – brother of the 10th Earl
Thomas George Lyon-Bowes, Lord Glamis (1801–1834)
Thomas Lyon-Bowes, Master of Glamis (1821–1821)
Thomas Lyon-Bowes, 12th Earl of Strathmore and Kinghorne (1822–1865) – grandson of the 11th Earl
Claude Bowes-Lyon, 13th Earl of Strathmore and Kinghorne (1824–1904) – brother of the 12th Earl
Claude George Bowes-Lyon, 14th and 1st Earl of Strathmore and Kinghorne (1855–1944) – maternal grandfather of Queen Elizabeth II. (created Earl of Strathmore and Kinghorne in the peerage of the United Kingdom in 1937)
Patrick Bowes-Lyon, 15th and 2nd Earl of Strathmore and Kinghorne (1884–1949)
John Patrick Bowes-Lyon, Master of Glamis (1910–1941)
Timothy Bowes-Lyon, 16th and 3rd Earl of Strathmore and Kinghorne (1918–1972)
Fergus Michael Claude Bowes-Lyon, 17th and 4th Earl of Strathmore and Kinghorne (1928–1987) – first cousin of the 16th Earl, grandson of the 14th Earl
Michael Fergus Bowes-Lyon, 18th and 5th Earl of Strathmore and Kinghorne (1957–2016)
 Simon Patrick Bowes-Lyon, 19th and 6th Earl of Strathmore and Kinghorne (b. 1986)
The heir presumptive is the current holder's younger brother, The Hon. John Fergus Bowes-Lyon (b. 1988).

Arms

See also

Clan Lyon
records of the County Durham estates are held by Durham County Record Office

References

Earldoms in the Peerage of Scotland

Clan Lyon
Earldoms in the Peerage of the United Kingdom
1372 establishments in Scotland
Noble titles created in 1606
Noble titles created in 1937